Arhab District is a district of the Sana'a Governorate, Yemen. , the district had a population of 90,038 inhabitants.

References

Districts of Sanaa Governorate
Arhab District